The Fanfani II Cabinet was the 13th cabinet of the Italian Republic, that held office from 2 July 1958 to 16 February 1959, for a total of 229 days, or 7 months and 14 days.

The government obtained the confidence in the Senate on 12 July 1958, with 128 votes in favor, 111 against and 2 abstentions, and in the Chamber of Deputies on 19 July, with 295 votes in favor, 287 against and 9 abstentions.

Party breakdown
 Christian Democracy (DC): Prime minister, 16 ministers, 29 undersecretaries
 Italian Democratic Socialist Party (PSDI): 4 ministers, 5 undersecretaries

Composition

References

Italian governments
1958 establishments in Italy
1959 disestablishments in Italy
Cabinets established in 1958
Cabinets disestablished in 1959